Raman Kapoor is an Indian singer and songwriter from Gurgaon, India. He was a contestant on the TV shows Sa Re Ga Ma Pa and Rising Star.

He is known for his songs "Neat Daru", "Do Ghunt Pilade", "Punjabi Song Saiyaan", "Mere Rashke Qamar"

Career 

Raman pursued his Sangeet Visharad (Diploma in music) from one of the most prestigious institutions, Gandharva Mahavidyalaya, New Delhi in Delhi.
Currently, he is working on his debut Punjabi album with T-Series

As a singer 
He is the lead singer of a band called OCP. Raman has also performed with renowned Bollywood singer, Mika Singh.

Works 
 Neat Daru 
 Do Ghunt Pilade
 Punjabi Song Saiyaan
 Mere Rashke Qamar

References

External links
 Raman Kapoor – Facebook
 Raman Kapoor – Instagram
 Raman Kapoor – YouTube

Living people
Indian male singer-songwriters
Indian singer-songwriters
People from Gurgaon
Year of birth missing (living people)